Entente Sportive de Collo, commonly known as Entente Collo or simply ESC for short, is an Algerian football club based in Collo. The club was founded in 1923 and its colours are green and white. Their home stadium, Stade Amar Benjamâa, has a capacity of 7,000 spectators. The club is currently playing in the Ligue Nationale du Football Amateur.

History
In 1966, the club was founded under the name of L’Entente Sportive Colliotte after the merger of the two local clubs of Collo, Jeunesse Sportive Colliotte and Club Omnisport Colliotte. In 1976, the club was renamed to Wifak Khachab wal Felline de Collo, or WFK Collo for short, as it became a part of the Entreprise de Liège et du Bois de Collo.

In 1980, the club won promotion to the Algerian Championnat National for the first time in its history. In their first season in the top flight, the club finished 10th in the league. In the 1984–1985 season, the club had its most successful season in the league, finishing in third place, just five points behind champions JE Tizi-Ouzou.

In 1986, the club reached the final of the Algerian Cup but lost to JE Tizi-Ouzou 1–0 in the final.

In the 1988–1989 season, the club was relegated to the second division after finishing last in the league.

Honours
 Algerian Cup
Runners-up (1): 1986

Performance in CAF competitions
African Cup Winners' Cup: 1 appearance
1987 – Second Round

Rival Clubs
  JSM Skikda (Derby)
  CRB Aïn Fakroun (Rivalry)

References

External links
E Collo Official Club Website

Football clubs in Algeria
Skikda Province
Association football clubs established in 1966
1966 establishments in Algeria
Sports clubs in Algeria